Ashraf Mabrouk Awaad (born June 1, 1972) is an Egyptian handball player. He competed for Egypt's national team at the 1992, 1996, 2000 Summer Olympics.

His brothers, Hazem, Hussein, Belal, Ibrahim and Hassan, are also international handball players.

References

External link

1972 births
Living people
Egyptian male handball players
Olympic handball players of Egypt
Handball players at the 1992 Summer Olympics
Handball players at the 1996 Summer Olympics
Handball players at the 2000 Summer Olympics